Manabendra Adhikary is a film producer from Assam, India. He was born on 17 January 1963 in Abhayapuri, Bongaigaon. After passing HSLC from Abhayapuri Abhayeswari H.S.M.P. School in 1978, he attended Guwahati Commerce College. After graduating in 1983, he went to Delhi for higher education. After completion of M.Com and MBA , he worked briefly in Delhi and returned to Guwahati in 1990 to start M. Adhikary & Associates, a finance and tax consultancy firm in Uzanbazar. In 2002, he began the construction company M/S Aadarsh Real Estate Pvt. Ltd, and ran his business with subordinates.

His wish to become a filmmaker was inspired by the films of Satyajit Ray,  Bhabendra Nath Saikia, and Jahnu Baruah. He began his film career by opening a production house named Artha Films in May 2013, whose objective is to present stories of the day-to-day lives of common people and raise the recognition of the Assamese film industry in India.

Films

Awards
 Best Feature Film in Assamese on 62nd National Film Awards
 Best Film Jury Award at Noida International Film Festival.
 Selected for Indian Panorama 2014, Directorate of Film Festivals
 Best Screenplay at Indian Cine Film Festival-14, Mumbai

References

Assamese film producers
Living people
1963 births
Businesspeople from Guwahati
Film producers from Assam